Jeanne Siméon (born 28 July 1952) is a Seychellois politician who was the Minister of Habitat, Lands, Infrastructure, and Land Transport from 27 April 2018 until 3 November 2020.

Previously Siméon served as Deputy Secretary for Cabinet Affairs in the Office of the President from October 2016 until being appointed as Minister in the newly formed Ministry of Family Affairs on 15 March 2017. Simeon was educated at the University of York and at the University of Leeds. After working as a teacher Siméon served as Principal Secretary of Education in the Ministry of Education

References

Living people
Alumni of the University of Leeds
Alumni of the University of York
Seychellois women in politics
Government ministers of Seychelles
United Seychelles Party politicians
1952 births
Women government ministers of Seychelles